Andrei Medvedev was the defending champion, but lost in the second round to Ronald Agénor.

Richard Krajicek won the title by defeating Carlos Costa 6–4, 7–6, 6–2 in the final.

Seeds
The first eight seeds received a bye into the second round.

Draw

Finals

Top half

Section 1

Section 2

Bottom half

Section 3

Section 4

References

External links
 Official results archive (ATP)
 Official results archive (ITF)

1994 ATP Tour